Classic Response is a charity fundraising event in aid of SOS Children.  It first occurred on 31 March 2005, in response to the 2004 Indian Ocean earthquake.  The Royal Albert Hall in London, is host to the concert.  On 3 April 2010, the 3rd Classic Response concert will be held, with profits going to the SOS Children Haiti Emergency Relief Programme.

Past performers at Classic Response have included: Aled Jones, G4, Julian Lloyd Webber, Russell Watson and the English Chamber Orchestra.

Classic Response 2005

The first Classic Response was initially set up in response to the 2004 Indian Ocean tsunami.  It was held on 31 March 2005, at the Royal Albert Hall in London.  Over £155,000 was raised for SOS Children from the event.

Classic Response 2006

The second Classic Response occurred on 15 April 2006.  It featured a speech by a child beneficiary of SOS Children.  Videos produced from visits to Africa, by G4 and Aled Jones, were also shown during the concert. 

Classic Response 2010

The third "Classic Response" concert at the Royal Albert Hall will raise funds for orphans of the 2010 Haiti earthquake. The performers include: Aled Jones, All Angels, Amy Dickson, Blake, Brighton Festival Chorus, Camilla Kerslake, Escala, Faryl Smith, Jennifer Pike, Paul Potts, Raven and Rhydian. The City of London Sinfonia will be conducted by Carl Davis. The evening's hosts are Aled Jones and GMTV's Emma Crosby. All proceeds will be donated to SOS Children's Haiti Emergency Relief appeal.

References 
 soschildrensvillages.org.uk

Classical music in the United Kingdom